Gua Nasib Bagus (Good Luck Cave) or Lubang Nasib Bagus is a cave located in the state of Sarawak in Malaysia. It is one of many caves found within Gunung Mulu National Park, a World Heritage Site on the island of Borneo.

The cave houses the second largest known underground chamber in the world, Sarawak Chamber. It is about 600 m long, about 415 m wide, and around about 80 m high.

References

Caves of Sarawak